Gaskill Township is a township in Jefferson County, Pennsylvania, United States. The population was 675 at the 2020 census. It was named for Charles C. Gaskill, agent of the Holland Land Company.

Geography
Gaskill Township occupies the southeastern corner of Jefferson County, and is bordered to the east by Clearfield County and to the south by Indiana County. It is bordered to the northwest by the borough of Big Run.

Mahoning Creek, a tributary of the Allegheny River, forms the northwestern border of the township.

Unincorporated communities in the township include Winslow, Bowersville and Foxburg.

History 
Gaskill was founded in 1841, from a portion of Young Township.

Demographics

As of the census of 2000, there were 671 people, 247 households, and 189 families residing in the township.  The population density was 31.2 people per square mile (12.0/km2).  There were 327 housing units at an average density of 15.2/sq mi (5.9/km2).  The racial makeup of the township was 99.11% White, 0.15% Asian, 0.45% Pacific Islander, and 0.30% from two or more races.

There were 247 households, out of which 34.0% had children under the age of 18 living with them, 62.3% were married couples living together, 8.5% had a female householder with no husband present, and 23.1% were non-families. 18.6% of all households were made up of individuals, and 8.9% had someone living alone who was 65 years of age or older.  The average household size was 2.63 and the average family size was 2.98.

In the township the population was spread out, with 24.9% under the age of 18, 6.7% from 18 to 24, 28.3% from 25 to 44, 22.8% from 45 to 64, and 17.3% who were 65 years of age or older.  The median age was 39 years. For every 100 females there were 95.6 males.  For every 100 females age 18 and over, there were 90.2 males.

The median income for a household in the township was $30,536, and the median income for a family was $36,563. Males had a median income of $29,444 versus $16,719 for females. The per capita income for the township was $14,649.  About 7.6% of families and 10.9% of the population were below the poverty line, including 10.7% of those under age 18 and 6.7% of those age 65 or over.

References

Populated places established in 1818
Townships in Jefferson County, Pennsylvania